Harry Edward Scherer  (1868 in Baltimore, Maryland – 2 April 1897 in New York, New York) was an American professional baseball player who played for the 1889 Louisville Colonels. He appeared in one game for the Colonels as an outfielder on July 24, 1889. He died on April 2, 1897

References

External links

1868 births
1897 deaths
Baseball players from Maryland
Louisville Colonels players
19th-century baseball players
Burials at the Cemetery of the Evergreens